The Garden of Desires  is a 1987 Soviet drama film directed by Ali Hamroyev.

Plot 
The film is set during the last summer before the Great Patriotic War. Three sisters are coming to stay with their grandmother in the village. They imagine the world as a vast and charming  garden of desires  and all members of the household are waiting for Asya's birthday. Asya has a sense of foreboding regarding the impending grief. Guests come to visit but none of them are her parents. She still does not know that her father was declared an enemy of the people, that tomorrow she will not see her mother and that the war is approaching.

Cast
 Marianna Velizheva as Asya
 Irina Shustaeva as Valeria, big sister 
 Olga Zarkhina as Tomka, younger sister
 Galina Makarova as grandma
 Mikhail Brylkin as  grandfather
 Aleksandr Feklistov as Pavel
 Lev Prygunov as Kirill, father  Tomka's and Lera's
Svetlana Tormakhova as mother Asya's
 Pyotr Kolbasin as  Ivan, uncle Asya's
Kira Muratova as witch

Criticism
Sergey Kudryavtsev
Against the background of these frightening details that break into the bright world of girls' dreams and violate its natural harmony, the feeling of happiness, the joy of being, of some  golden age  of the socialist empire, is incomprehensibly dominating.

Alexander Fyodorov
Young performers played not at all simple roles emotionally, uninhibitedly, without professional templates. Each of the sisters has his own character, temperament, a look at the world.

References

External links

 Новейшая история отечественного кино

1987 drama films
1987 films
Soviet drama films
Mosfilm films
1980s Russian-language films
1980s teen films